The Pottiaceae are a family of mosses. They form the most numerous moss family known, containing nearly 1500 species or more than 10% of the 10,000 to 15,000 moss species known.

Genera
The family has four subfamilies and 83 genera.

 Subfamily Trichostomoideae
Bryoceuthospora
Calymperastrum
Calyptopogon
Chionoloma
Eucladium
Leptobarbula
Neophoenix
Pachyneuropsis
Pleurochaete
Pottiopsis
Pseudosymblepharis
Quaesticula
Streptocalypta
Tetracoscinodon
Tetrapterum
Tortella Lindb.
Trachycarpidium
Trichostomum
Oxystegus
Tuerckheima Broth.
Uleobryum
Weissia
Weissiodicranum
 Subfamily Barbuloideae
Anoectangium
Barbula
Bellibarbula
Bryoerythrophyllum
Cinclidotus
Dialytrichia
Didymodon (e.g. Didymodon tomaculosus) 
Erythrophyllopsis
Ganguleea
Gertrudiella
Gymnostomum
Gymnostomiella
Gyroweisia
Hymenostyliella
Hymenostylium
Hyophila
Hyophiladelphus
Koponobryum
Leptodontiella
Leptodontium
Luisierella
Mironia
Molendoa
Plaubelia
Pseudocrossidium
Reimersia
Rhexophyllum
Sarconeurum (e.g. Sarconeurum glaciale)
Splachnobryum
Streptotrichum
Teniolophora
Trachyodontium
Triquetrella
Weisiopsis
 Subfamily Pottioideae
Acaulon
Aloina
Aloinella Cardot
Chenia
Crossidium
Crumia
Dolotortula
Globulinella
Hennediella
Hilpertia
Ludorugbya
Microbryum
Microcrossidium
Phascopsis
Pterygoneurum
Sagenotortula
Saitobryum
Stegonia
Stonea R. H. Zander
Streptopogon
Syntrichia
Tortula 
Willia
 Subfamily Merceyoideae
Scopelophila

The GBIF also lists Morinia , Saitoa, Sebillea , and Spruceella  but with no subfamily details.

Subfamily Timmielloideae (and its two genera of Timmiella and Luisierella) have been transferred to a new family Timmiellaceae, due to molecular phylogenetic analysis in 2014.

References

External links
Pottiaceae

 
Moss families